The Speaker of the Oklahoma House of Representatives is the presiding officer of the lower house of the Oklahoma Legislature, the Oklahoma House of Representatives. The speaker exercises administrative and procedural functions, but remains a representative of his legislative district. The current Speaker of the Oklahoma House of Representatives is Charles McCall, Republican from Atoka, Oklahoma.

The position was created in 1907 by the Oklahoma Constitution. Members of the Oklahoma House of Representatives vote for the speaker in the first legislative session following an election. Although there is no constitutional requirement to elect a speaker from the majority party, in practice, the speaker has never been a member of the minority party.  In 1929, a coalition of dissident Democratic members voted with the minority Republican caucus to oust Democrat Allen Street from the speaker's office and replace him with Democrat James C. Nance who was State Representative of Walters, Oklahoma. Under Nance, the Oklahoma House of Representatives presented 13 charges against Governor Henry S. Johnston. Johnston was impeached in March on one charge.

The speaker is third in line of succession to the Governorship of Oklahoma, behind the lieutenant governor and the President pro tempore of the Oklahoma Senate.

Powers and duties

The speaker holds a variety of powers as the presiding officer of the Oklahoma House of Representatives. Before any member may speak, he must seek the presiding officer's recognition. The presiding officer has discretion to call on members and control the flow of debate. The presiding officer decides questions of order during debate, seats the chamber, calls members to order for violating rules, and approves claims for supplies and services. The speaker is responsible for maintaining decorum and enforces the rules. On the floor of the Oklahoma House of Representatives, the presiding officer is always addressed as "Mister Speaker".

The speaker designates the number of committees and appoints committee leadership and membership. When a bill is introduced, the speaker determines which committee shall consider it. The speaker is an ex officio voting member that can participate in any committee vote. As a state representative, the speaker is entitled to participate in debate and to vote on the floor of the Oklahoma House of Representatives.

Following the general election, the Secretary of State of Oklahoma transmits the results of the election to the speaker. The speaker must open and announce the election results in the presence of a majority of the members of both the Oklahoma House of Representatives and Oklahoma Senate immediately following the organization of the Oklahoma House of Representatives and before proceeding to other business.

The Oklahoma Legislature may be called into special session by a written call signed by two-thirds of the members of the Oklahoma Senate and two-thirds of the members of the Oklahoma House of Representatives. Once conditions are met, the call is filed with the President Pro Tempore of the Senate and the Speaker of the House of Representatives who must issue a join order for the convening of the special session.

According to Section 16 of Article Six of the Oklahoma Constitution, the Speaker of the Oklahoma House of Representatives is third in the gubernatorial line of succession behind the Lieutenant Governor of Oklahoma and the President pro tempore of the Oklahoma Senate. No speaker has ever become the governor in that manner.

As the presiding officer of the Oklahoma House of Representatives, the speaker ranks above the speaker pro tempore, the majority leader, the majority whip, the majority caucus chair, and the appropriations committee chair. The minority leader is also an officer, but has little authority, other than to negotiate on behalf of the minority party on matters of legislative policy.

Selection
Article Five of the Oklahoma Constitution authorizes the Oklahoma House of Representatives to elect a speaker at the beginning of each regular session. Unlike the Speaker of the United States House of Representatives, the Speaker of the Oklahoma House of Representatives is required to be a member of the Oklahoma House of Representatives. The Oklahoma Constitution also allows for the election of a Speaker of the Oklahoma House of Representatives at "times as may be necessary," which include in the event of the resignation or death of a speaker or during special sessions.

In practice, speakers are elected following each biennial general election and serve two-year terms. Following the general election, the party holding the majority of seats in the Oklahoma House of Representatives comes together before the new Legislature comes into session and elects a speaker-elect. The Oklahoma House of Representatives formally elects the speaker on the first Tuesday after the first Monday in January in odd-numbered years. After the speaker is elected, he is sworn in by the chief justice of the Oklahoma Supreme Court.

An example of a case in which a speaker was elected under special circumstances was in 1983. Speaker Dan Draper was convicted of a felony, election fraud, and his office was declared vacant by Governor George Nigh. Nigh set the date for a special election. By the time Draper's conviction was overturned on judicial appeal, a new speaker had been elected.

History

Early years (1907–1929)

Following the statehood of Oklahoma in 1907, House members elected the first Speaker of the Oklahoma House of Representatives. Unlike present day speaker elections, there was no candidate with prior service in the House to choose from. Since the Democrats controlled the House, members knew the speaker was going to be a Democrat. After much deliberation, state representatives chose former Chickasaw Nation representative and President of the Oklahoma Constitutional Convention William H. Murray. Sworn into office on November 16, 1907, (the day Oklahoma joined the Union) Murray served as the speaker from 1907 to 1909.

In the first 13 years of Oklahoma's statehood, the Democrats held control of both the House and the Senate. However, in the 1920 mid-term elections, the Republicans won control of the House for the first time in state history due to problems faced by Democratic Governor James B. A. Robertson's administration.  The Republicans selected George B. Schwabe to control the House from 1921 to 1923. Under Speaker Schwabe's leadership, the Republican House was in constant conflict Democratic Senate. Following a scandal in the governor's office, Speaker Schwabe led the charge to impeach many state officials. The House came within one vote of impeaching Governor Robertson. They did impeach Lieutenant Governor Martin E. Trapp, but the state senate did not sustain the charges.

After the 1922 general election, the Democratic caucus regained control of the House. The Democrats would maintain their control of the House for the next eighty years.

Under Democratic Speaker Murray F. Gibbons, the state legislature impeached Governor Jack C. Walton, who was suspended on October 23, 1923, and convicted and removed from office of November 19, 1923, making Lieutenant Governor Martin E. Trapp acting governor upon his suspension and the sixth Governor of Oklahoma upon his conviction.

Historic bipartisan coalition
In 1929, a coalition of dissident Democratic members voted with the minority Republican caucus to oust Democrat Allen Street from the speaker's office and replace him with Democrat James C. Nance who was State Representative of Walters, Oklahoma. Under Nance, the Oklahoma House of Representatives presented 13 charges against Governor Henry S. Johnston. Johnston was impeached in March on one charge.

Mid-late 20th century (1930–1999)

Governor William H. Murray convinced state senator Tom Anglin to run for the Oklahoma House of Representatives, assuring him that he would be elected as Speaker. Under Anglin's leadership, the House approved the governor's proposed budget cuts.

Governor E.W. Marland helped Leon C. Phillips become Speaker in 1935 hoping to bring the obstructionist legislator to his side, but found that the new speaker opposed many of his proposals. Phillips would go on to succeed Marland and governor, becoming the first state representative in office to successfully campaign to become governor.

After the resignation of Speaker Harold Freeman in order to enter military service after the 1943 session, Merle Lansden was elected to the office, the first time a speaker was elected due to a vacancy. Lansden presided over a special session called by Governor Robert S. Kerr to ensure military men and women could participate in the 1944 elections.

In 1957, B.E. "Bill" Harkey became the first speaker to serve a second term. After Harkey's landmark victory, having one speaker serving multiple terms became the norm. From 1959 through 2005, 11 individuals have served as the speaker over 23 legislative sessions. During this 46-year period, all but one speaker served as two consecutive terms, with five speakers serving three consecutive terms. Jim Barker from Muskogee, Oklahoma, holds the current record of four consecutive terms, serving from 1983 to 1989. Barker's lengthy tenure set the stage for his ouster. In 1989, he was removed from office by a coalition of dissident Democratic members led by Representative Cal Hobson, voting with the Republican caucus. In this event, the Democratic caucus acting alone selected Representative Steve Lewis as the new speaker over Hobson.

Political realignment (2000–present)

After the 2004 Presidential Election, the Republicans gained control of the House for the first time since 1921. The Republicans selected Todd Hiett to serve as the Speaker of the Oklahoma House of Representatives. Had the Democratic caucus retained the majority, Jari Askins could have become the first female Speaker of the Oklahoma House of Representatives. In 2006, Republican Speaker pro Tempore Susan Winchester was seen by many political observers as in line to become the first female speaker, but lost out to Representative Lance Cargill, a former Majority leader.

Following the 2006 election, the Republicans retained the majority in the House for the first time in 82 years. They selected Lance Cargill to succeed Hiett as the Speaker. In 2008, Speaker Cargill resigned when he failed to properly address questions about his filing income and property taxes late and a campaign fundraising ethics investigation. Following Cargill's resignation as speaker in January 2008, Chris Benge was elected to succeed him. In 2010, Chris Benge was term-limited and therefore could not seek re-election. Kris Steele succeeded Benge in 2011.

In a ceremony on January 8, 2013, T.W. Shannon took the oath of office to be Oklahoma's first African-American Speaker of the House. He resigned as speaker on February 10, 2014 to run unsuccessfully for the U.S. Senate and was succeeded by Jeff W. Hickman.

List of speakers

See also
Speaker of the United States House of Representatives
Governor of Oklahoma

References

Government of Oklahoma
Oklahoma
Oklahoma Legislature